Cardiff City Football Club is a Welsh professional association football club based in Cardiff, Wales. The club was founded in 1899 and initially played in local amateur leagues before joining the English football league system. After spending a decade in the Southern Football League, Cardiff joined the Football League in 1920. Since then, the club has played in all four professional divisions of the Football League, spending 17 seasons in the top tier since its formation. Cardiff have also reached the final of the FA Cup on three occasions, winning the trophy in the 1927 final, and the League Cup once. The team currently play in the second tier of the English league system, the EFL Championship. 

Billy Hardy is the club's record appearance holder having played in 590 first team matches between 1911 and 1931. Phil Dwyer made the most appearances for the club in the Football League with 471. The club's goalscoring record is held by Len Davies who scored 179 times between 1919 and 1931. Davies is one of only eight players to have scored 100 or more goals in the club's history. 

The list encompasses the major honours won by Cardiff City, records set by the club, its managers and players, and details of its performance in European competition. The player records section itemises the club's leading goalscorers and those who have made most appearances in first-team competitions. It also records achievements by Cardiff City players on the international stage, and the highest transfer fees paid and received by the club. Attendance records at Ninian Park and the Cardiff City Stadium, the club's home grounds since 1910 and 2009 respectively, are also included.

Honours 
Cardiff City was originally founded in 1899 as Riverside A.F.C., initially playing in local amateur competitions. The club won its first trophy under the guise by winning the Bevan Shield, an amateur cup competition, in 1905. The club changed its name to Cardiff City in 1908 and entered the Southern Football League in 1910. The club was the first side based in South Wales to win the Welsh Cup after defeating Pontypridd in the 1912 final. The side won its first league honour by winning the Southern Football League Second Division title the following year, in the 1912–13 season. Cardiff entered the Football League in 1920 and enjoyed the most successful period in its history. Cardiff finished as First Division runners-up in the 1923–24 season and reached two FA Cup finals, losing the first in 1925 before becoming the only non-English side to win the cup two years later in 1927, defeating Arsenal 1–0. The club reached a third FA Cup final 82 years later in 2008 but suffered a 1–0 defeat to Portsmouth. The club is the second most successful side in the history of the Welsh Cup having won the competition on 22 occasions, one fewer than Wrexham. The most recent honour won by the club was the Championship title during the 2012–13 season.

Cardiff City's list of competition victories includes:

League titles

Southern Football League
Southern Football League Second Division
 Champions: 1912–13

Football League 
First Division/Premier League (first tier)
 Runners-up: 1923–24

Second Division/First Division/Championship (second tier)
 Champions: 2012–13
 Runners-up: 1920–21, 1951–52, 1959–60, 2017–18

 Third Division (south)/Third Division/Second Division/League One (third tier)
 Champions: 1946–47
 Runners-up: 1975–76, 1982–83
 Play-off Winners: 2003

 Fourth Division/Third Division/League Two (fourth tier)
 Champions: 1992–93
 Runners-up: 1987–88, 2000–01

Cups

 FA Cup
 Winners: 1926–27
 Finalists: 1924–25, 2007–08
FA Charity Shield
 Winners: 1927
Football League Cup
 Finalists: 2011–12
 Welsh Cup
 Winners: 1911–12, 1919–20, 1921–22, 1922–23, 1926–27, 1927–28, 1929–30, 1955–56, 1958–59, 1963–64, 1964–65, 1966–67, 1967–68, 1968–69, 1969–70, 1970–71, 1972–73, 1973–74, 1975–76, 1987–88, 1991–92, 1992–93
 Finalists: 1928–29, 1938–39, 1950–51, 1959–60, 1971–72, 1974–75, 1976–77, 1981–82, 1993–94, 1994–95
 FAW Premier Cup
 Winners: 2001–02
 Finalists: 1997–98

Match records

Firsts

 First Southern Football League match: 4–1 vs. Ton Pentre, 26 September 1910
 First Football League match: 0–0 vs. Clapton Orient, 30 August 1920
First Premier League match: 0-2 vs. West Ham United, 17 August 2013
First FA Cup match: 3–1 vs. Bath City, 17 September 1910
First League Cup match: 4–3 vs. Middlesbrough, 3 October 1960
First Welsh Cup match (As Cardiff Riverside): 3–12 vs. Cwmparc 1907–08
First match in Europe: 0–0 vs. Esbjerg fB, 9 September 1964 (UEFA Cup Winners' Cup)

Record results

Record Football League victory: 9–2 vs. Thames, Third Division South, 6 February 1932
Record FA Cup victory: 8–0 vs. Enfield, FA Cup First Round, 28 November 1931
Record Welsh Cup victory: 16–0 vs. Knighton Town, Welsh Cup Fifth Round, 28 January 1961
Record defeat: 2–11 vs. Sheffield United, 1 January 1926

Season records

Most wins in a season: 30 in 42 games, 1946–47
Most defeats in a season: 27 in 42 games, 1933–34
Most draws in a season: 23 in 46 games, 1997–98
Most goals scored in one season: 95, Third Division, 2000–01
Most goals conceded in one season: 105, Third Division South, 1933–34

Attendance records

Record ground attendance: 62,634, Wales vs. England, 17 October 1959 at Ninian Park
Club record attendance: 57,893 vs. Arsenal, 22 April 1953
At Cardiff City Stadium: 33,082 vs. Liverpool, 21 April 2019

Player appearance records

Youngest player: Aaron Ramsey – 16 years 126 days vs. Hull City – 28 April 2007
Oldest player: George Latham – 41 years 1 day vs. Blackburn Rovers – 2 January 1922

Most appearances

Competitive matches only, appearances as substitute in brackets and included in totals.

Longest run of consecutive league appearances
Defender Don Murray holds the record for the longest unbroken spell of appearances for the club, playing in 146 consecutive matches between May 1968 and November 1971.

Player scoring records

Most seasons as top goalscorer: Len Davies – 5, 1921–22, 1922–23, 1923–24, 1924–25, 1929–30
Most goals in one season: Robert Earnshaw – 35 (31 league, 4 cup) 2002–03
Most goals in one game: Derek Tapscott – 6 vs. Knighton Town, Welsh Cup, 28 January 1961
Most goals in a league fixture: 5
 Hughie Ferguson vs. Burnley, 1 September 1928
 Walter Robbins vs. Thames, 6 February 1931
 Jim Henderson vs. Northampton Town, 22 April 1933
Fastest goal scored: Trevor Ford – 15 seconds vs. Charlton Athletic, 23 October 1954
Fastest hattrick: Alan Warboys – 10 minutes vs. Carlisle United, 6 March 1971

All-time leading goalscorers

Number of appearances in brackets

Figures correct as of end of 2020–21 season

Progressive season scoring record

Richard Peake scored 19 goals in Cardiff's first season in the Southern Football League. This list charts the top scoring season record for the club on the occasions it has been beaten or equalled.

International records

Most capped player: Aron Gunnarsson (Iceland) – 62
First international cap: Jack Evans for Wales vs. Ireland 1912
Youngest player to gain international cap: Chris Gunter (Wales) 16 years 299 days vs. New Zealand – 26 May 2007

Manager records

First manager: Davy McDougall, August 1910
Longest serving manager (time and games): Fred Stewart, May 1911 to May 1933 (22 years and 605 games)

Transfers

First player signed: Jack Evans, 1910 from Cwmparc.

Record transfer fees paid

Record transfer fees received

Notes

References
Bibliography 

 

Specific 

Records And Statistics